Wang Wentian (born August 1963) is a Chinese diplomat currently serving as Chinese Ambassador to Cambodia since November 2018.

Biography
Born in August 1963, Wang joined the foreign service in 1991 and has served primarily in the Department of Asian Affairs and South Asia.
He was counsellor in Brunei from 2008 to 2010, counsellor in Switzerland from 2010 to 2013, and counsellor in Canada from 2014 to 2017. In July 2017, he had been appointed as Chinese Ambassador to Laos, taking over from Guan Huabing. He was designated by the Standing Committee of the National People's Congress in November 2018 to replace  as Chinese Ambassador to Cambodia.

Personal life 
Wang married Gu Xiaojun, the couple has a son and a daughter.

References

1963 births
Living people
Ambassadors of China to Laos
Ambassadors of China to Cambodia